The 2019 Women's Indoor Asia Cup was the seventh edition of the Women's Indoor Hockey Asia Cup, the biennial international women's indoor hockey championship of Asia organized by the Asian Hockey Federation. It was held alongside the men's tournament in Chonburi, Thailand from 15 to 21 July 2019.

Kazakhstan were the defending champions having won the 2017 edition. They defended their title by defeating the hosts Thailand 3–1 in the final. Uzbekistan won the bronze medal by defeating Malaysia 1–0 in a shoot-out.

Teams
For the first time nine teams competed in the tournament which was the highest number of competing teams ever. Nepal, the Philippines, and Singapore made their debuts.

Results
The match schedule and pools compositions were released on 21 May 2019 by the Asian Hockey Federation.

All times are local, ICT (UTC+7).

Preliminary round

Pool A

Pool B

Fifth to ninth place classification

Cross-over

Seventh and eighth place

Fifth and sixth place

First to fourth place classification

Semi-finals

Third and fourth place

Final

Final standings

See also
 2019 Men's Indoor Hockey Asia Cup

References

Women's Indoor Hockey Asia Cup
Indoor Asia Cup
International women's field hockey competitions hosted by Thailand
Indoor Hockey Asia Cup
Indoor Hockey Asia Cup Women
Sport in Chonburi province
Asia Cup